Johannes Ymminck, O.S.A. (died 1493) was a Roman Catholic prelate who served as Auxiliary Bishop of Paderborn (1469–1493) and Auxiliary Bishop of Münster (1472–1484).

Biography
Johannes Ymminck was ordained a priest in the Order of Saint Augustine. On 10 July 1469 he was appointed during the papacy of Pope Paul II as Auxiliary Bishop of Paderborn and Titular Bishop of Tiflis. On 24 February 1470, he was consecrated bishop by Nikolaus von Tüngen, Bishop of Warmia, with Antonio, Bishop of Civita Castellana e Orte, and Giacomo, Bishop of Sant'Angelo dei Lombardi, serving as co-consecrators. 

In 1472, he was appointed during the papacy of Pope Sixtus IV as Auxiliary Bishop of Münster. He served as Auxiliary Bishop of Münster until his resignation in 1484 and as the Auxiliary Bishop of Paderborn until death on 14 Apr 1493.

See also 
Catholic Church in Germany

References 

15th-century German Roman Catholic bishops
Bishops appointed by Pope Paul II
Bishops appointed by Pope Sixtus IV
1493 deaths
Augustinian bishops